Hotel Breeding, at 201-211 N. Main St. in Monticello, Kentucky, was listed on the National Register of Historic Places in 1988.

It is a two-and-a-half-story Colonial Revival-style hotel built in 1935–36.  It is built of structural clay tile
veneered in brick, on a concrete basement.

References

Hotel buildings on the National Register of Historic Places in Kentucky
Colonial Revival architecture in Kentucky
Hotel buildings completed in 1936
National Register of Historic Places in Wayne County, Kentucky
1936 establishments in Kentucky
Monticello, Kentucky